Jass-Ay-Lay-Dee is the eleventh studio album by the Ohio Players.  It was the 8th and last album they would record for Mercury.  The title is a unique spelling of the term "jazzy lady."  Unlike their last two efforts, the group remained with the nine-man roster that they had with Mr. Mean.

The group returned to the soul and funk that had been a big part of their sound, since the mellower, jazzier sounds of Mr. Mean (a soundtrack for a film directed by and starring Fred Williamson) failed to move fans and critics.  Low sales of that album would also lead to lower-than-expected sales for Jass-Ay-Lay-Dee.

Track listing
All tracks composed by Billy Beck, James "Diamond" Williams, Marshall Jones, Marvin "Merv" Pierce, Ralph "Pee Wee" Middlebrooks, Clarence Satchell and Leroy "Sugarfoot" Bonner
 "Funk-O-Nots" (4:48)
 "Sleepwalkin'" (5:27)
 "Jass-Ay-Lay-Dee" (8:18)
 "Nott Enuff" (4:58)
 "Time Slips Away/Shoot Yer Shot" (7:13)
 "Dance (If Ya Wanta)" (6:13)

Personnel
Clarence "Satch" Satchell - flute, alto saxophones, tenor saxophones, baritone saxophones, Varitone and vocals
Leroy "Sugarfoot" Bonner - guitars, percussion, and lead vocals
Marshall "Rock" Jones - electric bass
Ralph "Pee Wee" Middlebrooks - trumpets
James "Diamond" Williams - drums, congas, cowbell, percussion, and vocals
Billy Beck - Grand piano, Fender Rhodes piano, Hammond B-3 organ, Hohner D-6 Clavinet, RMI Electric piano, ARP Odyssey Synthesizer, ARP string ensemble, percussion, and vocals
Marvin "Merv" Pierce - trumpets, trombones & flugelhorn
Clarence "Chet" Willis - guitars & vocals
Robert "C.D." Jones - congas

Charts

Singles

References

External links
 Jass-Ay-Lay-Dee at Discogs

1978 albums
Ohio Players albums
Mercury Records albums